Leonard P. Smith (October 31, 1814 – April 20, 1886) was an American politician who served as the Mayor of Seattle from 1880 to 1882.

References

1814 births
1886 deaths
Mayors of Seattle
Washington (state) Republicans